

Final standings

ACC tournament
See 1964 ACC men's basketball tournament

NCAA tournament

Regional semi-finals
Duke        87, Villanova       73

Regional finals
Duke       101, Connecticut     54

National semi-finals
Duke        91, Michigan       80

National championship
UCLA         98, Duke           83

ACC's NCAA record
3–1

NIT
League rules prevented ACC teams from playing in the NIT, 1954–1966

External links
 https://web.archive.org/web/19990902044613/http://www.sportsstats.com/bball/standings/1964